Mallankinaru is a panchayat town in Virudhunagar district in the Indian state of Tamil Nadu.

Demographics
 India census, Mallankinaru had a population of 11,804. Males constitute 51% of the population and females 49%. 13 km from Virudhunagar. Mallankinaru has an average literacy rate of 64%, higher than the national average of 59.5%: male literacy is 74%, and female literacy is 53%. In Mallankinaru, 12% of the population is under 6 years of age.

Adjacent communities

Reference 

Cities and towns in Virudhunagar district